Pookkal Vidum Thudhu is a 1987 Indian Tamil-language teen romance film produced and directed by Sreedhar Rajan, and written by T. Rajendar who also composed the music. A remake of the Malayalam film Nakhakshathangal (1986), it stars Monisha, Srividya and Hariharan. The film was released on 21 October 1987.

Plot

Cast 
Monisha as Gowri
Srividya as Kalaivani
Hariharan as Hari
Goundamani as Dharmadurai
Janagaraj as Murugesan
Senthil as Manmadha
Vennira Aadai Moorthy as the film producer

Production 
Pookkal Vidum Thudhu, a remake of the Malayalam film Nakhakshathangal (1986), is the third and final film directed by Sreedhar Rajan.<ref>{{Cite web |last=ராஜன் |first=அய்யனார் |date=6 March 2018 |title=" 'ஆர்வம் இருக்குல்ல, அது போதும்'ன்னார், சத்யஜித் ரே! – இன்றைய சூழலை அன்றே சொன்ன 'கண் சிவந்தால் மண் சிவக்கும்' #35YearsOfKannSivanthaalMannSivakkum |url=https://cinema.vikatan.com/tamil-cinema/118399-sridhar-rajan-interview-about-35-years-of-kann-sivanthaal-mann-sivakkum |url-access=subscription |url-status=live |archive-url=https://web.archive.org/web/20221221085432/https://cinema.vikatan.com/tamil-cinema/118399-sridhar-rajan-interview-about-35-years-of-kann-sivanthaal-mann-sivakkum |archive-date=21 December 2022 |access-date=21 December 2022 |website=Ananda Vikatan |language=ta}}</ref> Monisha, the lead actress of the original, repeated her role. Hariharan's voice was dubbed by Ravishankar Devanarayanan.

 Soundtrack 
The music was composed by T. Rajendar who also wrote the lyrics. The song "Kadhiravanai Paarthu" is set in the Carnatic raga Bowli.

 Release and reception Pookkal Vidum Thudhu was released on 21 October 1987, during Diwali, and distributed by Simbu Cine Arts. The Indian Express wrote that the film was "swamp[ed]" with an "extravagant assortment of comedians" and an "indiscriminate flurry of songs that take the film nowhere in particular", although the critic said Monisha had "the advantage of being a newface in Tamil films" and Hariharan was "cast well for playing a delicate role. Srividya as his benefactress sparkles in a few scenes". Despite facing competition from other Diwali releases including Manithan and Nayakan'', it was well received by the audience.

References

External links 
 

1980s Tamil-language films
1980s teen romance films
Films directed by Sreedhar Rajan
Films scored by T. Rajendar
Films with screenplays by T. Rajendar
Indian teen romance films
Tamil remakes of Malayalam films